Michael Arthur Josef Jakob Hainisch (15 August 1858 – 26 February 1940) was an Austrian politician who served as the first President of Austria from 1920 to 1928, after the fall of the monarchy at the end of World War I.

Origins
Hainisch was born and named after his father who was a factory owner. His mother Marianne Hainisch was a leader in the suffrage movement.

He started out as a lawyer and an official of the Treasury and of the Education Department, but then retired to his estates in Lower Austria and Styria, where he carried on model farming, became a leader of the Austrian branch of the Fabian movement, and one of the founders of the Central People's Library. In later years he moved away from radical socialism to become a conservative agrarian.

Presidency

Hainisch held aloof from political parties. He was chosen president because of his personal authority, although he was not a member of the parliament. He was an independent candidate. He was elected and assumed office in 1920, and stayed for two periods until 1928. He was married to Emilia Figdor, the descendant of a prominent Viennese assimilated Jewish family. Emilia's father, Gustav, was a town councillor of the city of Vienna.

As a president, he worked hard to improve the dire situation Austria found itself after the war.
He did a lot to develop the agricultural sector, encouraged the electrification of the railway, tried to develop more tourism especially in the Alps. Trade with neighbouring countries such as Germany was encouraged. He also became a protector of local traditions and culture and initiated the creation of the law of protected monuments.

He became also an honorary member of the Akademie der Wissenschaften (Academy of Sciences).

In 1928, main parties proposed to amend the constitution in order to reelect Hainisch for a third term. Federal Chancellor Ignaz Seipel proposed a one-year term for Hainisch, but Hainisch declined a third term. He subsequently served as Commerce Minister from 1929 to 1930.

Controversially, he supported Pan-German ideas and later supported the Anschluss of Austria to Nazi-Germany in 1938, as did many of his compatriots. He died in February 1940, just nearly two years after the Anschluss and a few months after World War II started.

Works
He was a fertile author of works on sociology and politics:
 Zukunft der Oesterreicher ("The future of the Austrians," 1892)
 Zur Wahlreform ("Towards electoral reform," 1895)
 Kampf ums Dasein und Sozialpolitik ("The fight for existence and social politics," 1899)
 Heimarbeit (1906)
 Fleischnot und Alpine Landwirtschaft

Awards
Grand Cross of the Order of the White Lion, Czechoslovakia (1926)
Wilhelm Exner Medal, 1926

References

External links
Hofburg.at: Michael Hainisch 
AEIOU: Michael Hainisch 
 

1858 births
1940 deaths
People from Neunkirchen District, Austria
Presidents of Austria
University of Vienna alumni
Grand Crosses of the Order of the White Lion